Michael Gerald Melnyk (September 16, 1934 – June 14, 2001) was a Canadian professional ice hockey forward who played in the National Hockey League (NHL) for the Detroit Red Wings, Chicago Black Hawks and St. Louis Blues between 1956 and 1968. The rest of his career, which lasted from 1953 to 1968, was spent in the minor leagues. After retiring in 1968, Melnyk became a scout with the Philadelphia Flyers, a role he would remain at until 1997.

Playing career
Melnyk began his NHL career with the Detroit Red Wings during the 1956 Stanley Cup playoffs. He also played for the Chicago Black Hawks and St. Louis Blues. After playing the 1967–68 season with the Blues, Melnyk was traded to the Philadelphia Flyers but retired a week prior to the start of the new season. He became a scout for the Flyers and successfully lobbied for the selection of Bobby Clarke at the 1969 NHL Amateur Draft. In 269 regular season NHL games, Melnyk recorded 39 goals and 77 assists for 116 career points.

Career statistics

Regular season and playoffs

References

External links
 

1934 births
2001 deaths
Buffalo Bisons (AHL) players
Canadian expatriate ice hockey players in the United States
Canadian ice hockey centres
Canadian people of Ukrainian descent
Chicago Blackhawks players
Detroit Red Wings players
Edmonton Flyers (WHL) players
Edmonton Oil Kings (WCHL) players
National Hockey League All-Stars
Philadelphia Flyers scouts
St. Louis Blues players
St. Louis Braves players
Ice hockey people from Edmonton